Canyon Falls may refer to:

Canyon Falls, Kentucky,  an unincorporated community in Lee County
Canyon Falls Bridge, Michigan, in L'Anse Township, Michigan
Canyon Falls (Washington), on the South Fork Skykomish River